Pargi Assembly constituency is a constituency of Telangana Legislative Assembly, India. It is one of the constituencies in Vikarabad district. It is part of Chevella Lok Sabha constituency.

T Ram Mohan Reddy of Indian National Congress represents the constituency from 2014 to 2018.
In the recent elections, Koppula Mahesh Reddy of Telangana Rashtra Samithi won the elections and represents the constituency.

Mandals
The Assembly Constituency presently comprises the following Mandals

MLA's

Election results

Telangana Legislative Assembly election, 2018

Telangana Legislative Assembly election, 2014

See also
 List of constituencies of Telangana Legislative Assembly
 Pargi

References

Assembly constituencies of Telangana
Ranga Reddy district